St. Leonard's Church, Newark is a parish church in the Church of England in Newark-on-Trent, Nottinghamshire.

History
The first church was built in Northgate in 1873 and designed by the architects Evans and Jolly of Nottingham. It cost £4,000 and was consecrated by Christopher Wordsworth, Bishop of Lincoln on 28 January 1873.

The organist in 1899–1903 was William Thompson Wright, who was afterwards organist of Church of St. Mary Magdalene, Newark-on-Trent.

A new church was built to replace the old in 1978, in Lincoln Road. It was designed by the architect Gordon Smith and dedicated by the Bishop of Southwell on 5 November 1978.

Notes

Newark on Trent
Newark on Trent
Newark on Trent
Newark on Trent
Newark-on-Trent